

List of managers

  Amílcar Barbuy (1915–16), (1917–18), (1919), (1920)
  Neco (1920), (1927)
  Pedro Mazzulo (1933–34)
  Amílcar Barbuy (1934), (1935), (1936)
  Rato (1937)
  Neco (1937–38)
  Armando Del Debbio (1939–42)
  Rato (1942–43)
  Amílcar Barbuy (1943)
  Armando Del Debbio (1947–48)
  Cláudio (1948)
  Rato (1951–54)
  Cláudio (1954)
  Osvaldo Brandão (1954–57)
  Cláudio (1956), (1958), (1959)
  Sylvio Pirillo (1959–60)
  Alfredo Ramos (1961)
  Martim Francisco (1961–62)
  Manuel Fleitas Solich (1962)
  Armando Del Debbio (1963)
  Paulo Amaral (1964)
  Roberto Belangero (1964)
  Osvaldo Brandão (1964–66)
  Zezé Moreira (1966–67)
  Lula (1967–68)
  Osvaldo Brandão (1968)
  Dino Sani (1969–70)
  Yustrich (1973–74)
  Sylvio Pirillo (1974–75)
  Dino Sani (1975)
  Osvaldo Brandão (1977–78)
  Armando Renganeschi (1978)
  Jorge Vieira (1979–80)
  Osvaldo Brandão (1980–81)
  Mário Travaglini (1982–83)
  Zé Maria (1983)
  Jorge Vieira (1983–84)
  Jair Picerni (1984–85)
  Carlos Alberto Torres (1985–86)
  Rubens Minelli (1986)
  Jorge Vieira (1986–87)
  Jair Pereira (1988)
  Ênio Andrade (1989)
  Nelsinho Baptista (1990–91)
  Cilinho (1991)
  Nelsinho Baptista (1992–93)
  Jair Pereira (1994)
  Carlos Alberto Silva (1994–95)
  Valdir Espinosa (1996)
  Nelsinho Baptista (1996–97)
  Joel Santana (1997)
  Vanderlei Luxemburgo (1998)
  Evaristo de Macedo (1999)
  Oswaldo de Oliveira (1999–00)
  Vadão (2000)
  Vanderlei Luxemburgo (2001)
  Darío Pereyra (2001)
  Carlos Alberto Parreira (2002)
  Geninho (2003)
  Júnior (2003)
  Juninho Fonseca (2003–04)
  Oswaldo de Oliveira (2004)
  Tite (2004–05)
  Daniel Passarella (2005)
  Márcio Bittencourt (2005)
  Antônio Lopes (2005–06)
  Ademar Braga (interim) (2006)
  Geninho (2006)
  Émerson Leão (2006-07)
  Paulo César Carpegiani (2007)
  Zé Augusto (interim) (2007)
  Nelsinho Baptista (2007)
  Mano Menezes (2008–10)
  Adilson Batista (2010)
  Fábio Carille (interim) (2010)
  Tite (2010–13)
  Mano Menezes (2014)
  Tite (2015–16)
  Fábio Carille (interim) (2016)
  Cristóvão Borges (2016)
  Fábio Carille (interim) (2016)
  Oswaldo de Oliveira (2016)
  Fábio Carille (2017–18)
  Osmar Loss (2018)
  Jair Ventura (2018)
  Fábio Carille (2019)
  Dyego Coelho (interim) (2019)
  Tiago Nunes (2020)
  Dyego Coelho (interim) (2020)
  Vágner Mancini (2020-21)
  Fernando Lázaro (interim) (2021) 
  Sylvinho (2021–2022)
  Fernando Lázaro (interim) (2022)
  Vítor Pereira (2022)
  Fernando Lázaro (2023–)

Sport Club Corinthians Paulista managers